The 2012–13 Kuwaiti Premier League season is the 51st since the league's establishment. The season starts on 14 September 2012 and ends on the 19 April 2013. Kuwait SC won the league title for the 11th time. Kuwait SC has the longest unbeaten record for 21 games. Rogério and Issam Jemâa won the top goal scorers of the season with 11 goal each.

Teams
Al Shabab were relegated to the Kuwaiti Division One league after finishing bottom in the 2011–12 season. They were replaced by Al Salibikhaet, back in the top flight for the first time since relegation in the 2009–10 campaign.

Personnel and sponsorship

League standing

Promotion/relegation playoff

1st Leg

2nd Leg

Al Salmiyah secured place in the top flight after winning 5–2 on aggregate.

Results

Matches 1 - 14

Matches 15 - 21

Top goalscorers

 

Kuwait Premier League seasons
Kuwaiti Premier League
1